Du Shenyan (ca. 645–708) was a Chinese poet and politician. He was a poet of the early Tang dynasty, and one of whose poems was collected in the popular anthology Three Hundred Tang Poems.

Biography
Du Shenyan was born around 646 and lived into his sixties. He was a poet, calligrapher (none of which is known to survive), and the grandfather of the famous poet Du Fu.

Poetry
Du Shenyan is perhaps best known for his one poem which is included in the Three Hundred Tang Poems, translated by Witter Bynner as "On a Walk in the Early Spring Harmonizing a Poem By my Friend Lu Stationed at Changzhou". A total of Forty-three of his poems survive.

Notes

References
Wu, John C. H. (1972). The Four Seasons of Tang Poetry. Rutland, Vermont: Charles E.Tuttle.

External links
 

708 deaths
7th-century births
7th-century Chinese poets
8th-century Chinese poets
Du clan of Jingzhao
Poets from Henan
Three Hundred Tang Poems poets
Writers from Zhengzhou
Year of death unknown